Shahrudin Mohamed Ali (born 5 May 1941) is a Malaysian sprinter. He competed in the men's 100 metres at the 1960 Summer Olympics.

References

External links
 

1941 births
Living people
Athletes (track and field) at the 1960 Summer Olympics
Malaysian male sprinters
Olympic athletes of Malaya
People from Selangor
Asian Games medalists in athletics (track and field)
Asian Games bronze medalists for Malaysia
Athletes (track and field) at the 1962 Asian Games
Medalists at the 1962 Asian Games